Kharas is a Palestinian town in the southern State of Palestine, located twelve kilometers northwest of Hebron, part of the Hebron Governorate. According to the Palestinian Central Bureau of Statistics, the town had a population of 10.210 inhabitants in 2019.  It is situated at the northern mouth of the Wadi ’Arab near the ruins of 'Elah. Nearby towns include Nuba and Beit Ula to the south, Surif to the north and Halhul to the east.  It has a total land area of 6,781 dunams.

History
In the late Ottoman era, in 1838, Edward Robinson noted Kharas S 14° E from Bayt Nattif. It was further noted as a Muslim village, between the mountains and Gaza, but subject to the government of Hebron.

Socin found from an official Ottoman  village list from about 1870 that Charas had 38 houses and a population of 120, though the population count included men, only. Hartmann found that  Charas had 40 houses.

In 1883, the PEF's Survey of Western Palestine described Kharas as "a small village standing high on the side of one  of the lower hills, with olives round it. On the east is a well."

British Mandate era
In the 1922 census of Palestine, conducted by the British Mandate authorities, Kharas had a population of 577, all Muslim, increasing in the 1931 census to 739, still all Muslim, in 153 houses.

In the 1945 statistics the population of Kharas was 970 Muslims, and the land area 6,781 dunams of land  according to an official land and population survey. 615 dunams were plantations and irrigable land, 3,532  for cereals, while 38 dunams were built-up (urban) land.

Jordanian era
In the wake of the 1948 Arab–Israeli War, and after the 1949 Armistice Agreements, Kharas came under Jordanian rule from 1948 until 1967. It was annexed by Jordan in 1950.

The Jordanian census of 1961 found 1,264 inhabitants in Kharas.

Post 1967
Since the Six-Day War in 1967, Kharas  has been under Israeli occupation.

Israel has confiscated approximately 2,000 dunums of the village land, half of which was used for the construction of the separation wall. After completion of the wall, 600 dunums of village land will be on the Israeli side of the wall (in the Seam Zone), isolated from the village.

There are five schools in the town: a boy's secondary school, a girls' secondary school, Khaled ibn al-Walid basic mixed primary school, a girls' primary school and a mixed gender high school. There are four mosques, a sports club, a government-run health clinic and an olive press (olive oil manufacturing is a major industry in the town).

References

Bibliography

External links
Kharas website (Kharas website) 
 Welcome To Kharas
Kharas, Welcome to Palestine
Survey of Western Palestine, Map 21:  IAA, Wikimedia commons
Kharas Town (Fact Sheet),  Applied Research Institute–Jerusalem (ARIJ)
Kharas Town Profile, ARIJ
Kharas aerial photo, ARIJ
The priorities and needs for development in Kharas town based on the community and local authorities’ assessment, ARIJ

Towns in the West Bank
Hebron Governorate
Municipalities of the State of Palestine
Valley of Elah